Filmy is an Indian Hindi language movie channel based in Mumbai, Maharashtra. It is owned by Sahara One Media & Entertainment Limited and was launched on 12 February 2006.

Programs
The channel also telecasts other programs besides telecasting Cinema. Such as,
 Aaj Ki Filmy Khabar
 Bathroom Singer
 Bollywood Ka Boss
 Filmy Hot Break
 Filmy Stock Exchange
 Rocky's 99
 The Jungle Book

See also
 List of Indian television stations
 Filmy (Canada)

References

External links
Official Website

Twitter = 

Sahara One Media and Entertainment Limited

Television stations in Mumbai
Hindi-language television channels in India
Television channels and stations established in 2006
Movie channels in India
Sahara India Pariwar